Malletts Creek is a stream in Washtenaw County, Michigan. A tributary to the Huron River, much of Malletts Creek's watershed lies within urban or suburban areas. Approximately 40% of the land within the creek's watershed is topped with impermeable surfaces. As a result, the stream exists in an extremely impaired state, and testing sites on the stream monitored through the "Adopt-A-Stream" program continuously indicate the streams poor quality.

Watershed 
Malletts Creek is located primarily in the city of Ann Arbor, though its 11 square-mile watershed also includes northern Pittsfield Township, and very small portions of the townships of Ann Arbor, Superior, Lodi and Scio. Malletts Creek flows into South Pond, a side channel of the Huron River.

Restoration 
Washtenaw County is implementing restoration plans in partnership with Ann Arbor, Pittsfield Township, Huron River Watershed Council, and other groups to improve the water quality of Malletts Creek. Works completed as of May 2014 include stabilization of the stream's banks and creation of native prairie land and riparian wetland habitats on various parts of the main channel, as well as a tributary flowing through County Farm Park.

See also 
 County Farm Park
 Huron River

References 

Rivers of Washtenaw County, Michigan
Rivers of Michigan
Huron River (Michigan)
Tributaries of Lake Erie